Viljo Oskari Kilpeläinen (15 August 1906 – 12 May 1937) was a Finnish industrial worker and politician, born in Pudasjärvi. He served as a Member of the Parliament of Finland from 1936 until his death in 1937, representing the Social Democratic Party of Finland (SDP).

References

1906 births
1937 deaths
People from Pudasjärvi
People from Oulu Province (Grand Duchy of Finland)
Social Democratic Party of Finland politicians
Members of the Parliament of Finland (1936–39)